The Happiest Place in Town is the second and final studio album by Australian rock/pop group Do-Re-Mi and was released by Virgin Records in August 1988. The album has twelve tracks, which were written by lead vocalist Deborah Conway, drummer Dorland Bray, bass guitarist Helen Carter and guitarist Stephen Philip.

Track listing 
All tracks were written by Deborah Conway, Dorland Bray, Helen Carter and Stephen Philip, except where indicated.
 "Haunt You"
 "King of Moomba"
 "Adultery" (Bray, Carter, Philip)
 "Valentine's Day"
 "Take Me Anywhere" (Bray, Carter, Philip)
 "Heads Will Roll"
 "Disneyland"
 "Wild and Blue" (Conway, Carter, Philip)
 "Desert Song"
 "Friends Like You" (Bray, Carter, Philip)
 "That Hanging Business" (Bray, Carter, Philip)
 "The Happiest Place in Town" (Philip, Bray)

Charts

Personnel 
Do-Ré-Mi members
Dorland Bray — drums, percussion, backing vocals
Helen Carter — bass guitar, backing vocals
Deborah Conway — lead vocalist
Stephen Philip — guitar

Additional musicians
Alan Dunn — piano accordion
Johnny Mars — harmonica
Bob Noble — piano, keyboards, organ (Hammond)
Frank Ricotti — trumpet
Steve Sidwell — piccolo trumpet
John Thirkell — trumpet
Philip Todd — saxophone (tenor)

Recording details
Producer — Martin Rushent

References 

1988 albums
Do-Re-Mi (band) albums
Virgin Records albums